Austen is an unincorporated community in Preston County, West Virginia, United States.

The community may be named for one Dr. Austen, the original owner of the town site.

References 

Unincorporated communities in West Virginia
Unincorporated communities in Preston County, West Virginia
Coal towns in West Virginia